Yodsanklai Fairtex a.k.a. Yod (Thai: ยอดแสนไกล แฟร์เท็กซ์; born, July 1, 1985) is a retired Thai Muay Thai kickboxer. He is a former WBC Muay Thai World Super welterweight champion at 154 lbs, and a two-time Lumpinee Stadium champion in the 112 and 147 lb weight classes. He is also the first champion of The Contender Asia. He was nicknamed "The Boxing Computer" by Thai sports newspapers as a testament to his perfect fighting technique.

He trains out of Fairtex Gym in Pattaya, Thailand, 
On June 11, 2017, he announced on Facebook that he would be retiring from fighting. On Dec 26, 2017 he announced on Facebook that he will come back to ring in February 2018. In his return, Yodsanklai signed with ONE Championship.

As of 1 November 2018, he is ranked by Combat Press 5th lightweight in the world. As of September 6, 2019, he is ranked the #10 lightweight in the world by Combat Press.

Background
Yodthanong Photirat was born in the Nong Bua Lamphu Province in Northeastern Thailand, the hotbed of Muay Thai. He was introduced to the sport by his older brother Yodkangwan and started practicing when he was eight years old after watching his brothers' fights. He had his first fight at a temple fair in Ban Na Dee, his hometown, and received a fight fee of 20 ฿.

Career 
Before joining Fairtex in 2005, Yodsanklai fought for three camps: Saknipaporn, Sit-Khru-Od and Petchyindee. In August 2005, fighting under the name of Yodsanklai Petchyindee (ยอดแสนไกล เพชรยินดี), he won one of the most prestigious Muay Thai titles, the Lumpinee Stadium belt, by knocking out Runglaew. He became the 154 pound WBC Muay Thai World Champion by defeating Australian John Wayne Parr on December 10, 2005, in Gold Coast, Australia. In 2005, he won the Champion of Thailand (154 lb) title.

On June 30, 2006, Yodsanklai made his K-1 Max debut at Superfight at the K-1 World MAX 2006 World Championship Final held in Yokohama, Japan. He won against Kamal el Amrani by three round unanimous decision. Yodsanklai defended his WBC title on November 11, 2006, against Mark Vogel in Wuppertal, Germany, winning the fight by first round elbow knockout.

On November 29, 2007, Yodsanklai had a non-title contest at the "France vs Thailand" event held in Paris, France, against the Frenchmen Farid Villaume. Yodsanklai won the fight by third round referee stoppage TKO.

He fought former stablemate Kem Sitsongpeenong at Muay Thai Combat Mania: Pattaya in Pattaya, Thailand, on December 30, 2012, at a weight of 71 kg/156 lb, with same-day weigh-ins. Despite having not made such a low weight in a number of years, Yod came in at the limit in visibly better shape than in most of his recent fights and KO'd Kem with an elbow in round three.

Yod knocked out Gregory Choplin in round three at Lion Fight 8 in Las Vegas, Nevada, USA, on January 25, 2013. He defeated Yohan Lidon by unanimous decision in a rematch at Warriors Night in Levallois, France, on March 2, 2013. On April 19, 2013, Yodsanklai TKO'd Naimjon Tuhtaboyev in round two at Thai Fight in Pattaya.

In June 2013, it was initially reported that Yodsanklai would fight Antuan Siangboxing at Thai Fight in Bangkok. However, his opponent was later switched to Kazbek Zubarov. He won via TKO at the end of round one when Zubarov suffered an injury.

Yod defeated Chike Lindsay for the inaugural Lion Fight Middleweight (-70 kg/154 lb) Championship at Lion Fight 10 in Las Vegas on July 26, 2013. Lindsay started well, but Yodsanklai took over in round two and began to cut the American up before taking the unanimous decision.

It was reported that Yod would fight Raphaël Llodra at the WBC World Muay Thai Millennium Championship in Saint-Pierre, Réunion, on September 7, 2013. However, he turned the fight down for monetary reasons. Instead, he knocked out Vladimir Konsky with a first round elbow in the quarter-finals of the 2013 edition of Thai Fight's -70 kg/154 lb tournament in Thailand on October 23, 2013. Then in semifinals, he defeated Samy Sana on November 30, 2013, and advanced to the final. He would go on to knock out Expedito Valin and win the tournament.

Yod was set to fight at Hero Legends in Jinan, China, on December 3, 2014 but withdrew for undisclosed reasons. He was also briefly expected to fight in the main event of Lion Fight 13 in Las Vegas on February 7, 2014, but quickly withdrew. He returned to the ring and beat Keo Rumchang by second-round KO at Thai Fight: Hua Hin 2014 in Hua Hin, Thailand, on February 22, 2014.

On May 1, 2017, Combat Press ranked Yodsanklai the #4 lightweight in the world.

On February 3, 2018 Yodsanklai returned to the ring, scoring a unanimous decision against German Enriko Kehl at Wu Lin Feng in Shenzhen, China.

ONE Championship 
Yodsanklai then signed for ONE Championship. In his debut, he defeated Chris Ngimbi via unanimous decision. In his second bout with the promotion, he knocked out Luis Regis in the first round. At ONE Championship: A New Era on March 31, 2019, Yodsanklai defeated Andy Souwer by second-round technical knockout.

He was then entered in to the ONE Super Series Kickboxing Featherweight World Grand Prix, alongside the likes of Giorgio Petrosyan, Andy Souwer, and Petchmorrakot Petchyindee Academy. He would lose to Samy Sana by unanimous decision in Grand Prix Quarter-Finals at ONE Championship: Enter the Dragon.

On October 23, 2019, it was announced that Yodsanklai was scheduled to face World Lethwei Championship champion Sasha Moisa at ONE Championship: Age Of Dragons, his opponent was changed to Jamal Yusupov. In an upset, Yodsanklai lost to Yusupov, who'd taken the fight on short notice, by second-round knockout. This marked Yodsanklai's first knockout loss since 2005.

On June 28, 2020, it was announced that Yodsanklai would challenge Phetmorakot Petchyindee Academy for the ONE Featherweight Muay Thai World Championship at ONE Championship: No Surrender on July 31, 2020. Despite showing an improved performance from his last two fights, Yodsanklai was unable to win the title and lost to Phetmorakot by split decision.

Second retirement
On March 1, 2021, Yodsanklai announced his second retirement on social media.

Titles 
 Lion Fight
 2014 Lion Fight Middleweight (-70 kg/154 lb) Championship
 2013 Lion Fight Middleweight (-70 kg/154 lb) Championship
 Thai Fight
 2014 Thai Fight -70 kg/154 lb Tournament Championship 
 2013 Thai Fight -70 kg/154 lb Tournament Championship
 14–1 record
 World Muaythai Council (WMC) 
 2012 WMC World Middleweight (160 lbs) champion
 2010 WMC/S1 King's Cup Challenger tournament champion
 2008 WMC World Middleweight (160 lbs) champion
 2008 WMC Contender Asia champion
 Toyota Marathon
 2011 Toyota Vigo Marathon tournament runner up - 72 kg
 2003 Toyota D4D Marathon tournament (126 lbs) winner
 SportAccord Combat Games 
 2010 SportAccord Combat Games Silver medal - 75 kg
 World Professional Muaythai Federation (WPMF)
 2009 WPMF World Super Middleweight (168 lbs) champion
 2006 WPMF World Super Welterweight (154 lbs) champion
 Super 8
 2008 Super 8 Guinea tournament champion
 KO World Series 
 2008 KO World Series Auckland Middleweight champion
 WBC Muay Thai
 2005–2009 WBC Muay Thai World Super Welterweight (154 lbs) champion
 Professional Boxing Association of Thailand (PAT)
 2005 Professional Boxing Association of Thailand (PAT) Super Welterweight (154 lbs) champion
 Lumpinee Stadium
 2005 Lumpinee Stadium Welterweight (147 lbs) champion
 2001 Lumpinee Stadium Flyweight (112 lbs) champion

Fight record

|-  style="background:#fbb;"
| 2020-07-31|| Loss ||align=left| Phetmorakot Petchyindee Academy || ONE Championship: No Surrender || Bangkok, Thailand || Decision (Majority) || 5 || 3:00    
|-
! style=background:white colspan=9 |
|-  style="background:#fbb;"
|  2019-11-16 || Loss || align="left" | Jamal Yusupov ||  ONE Championship: Age Of Dragons || Beijing, China || KO (Punches) || 2 || 0:35
|-
|-  style="background:#fbb;"
|  2019-05-17 || Loss || align="left" | Samy Sana ||  ONE Championship: Enter the Dragon || Kallang, Singapore || Decision (Unanimous) || 3 || 3:00
|-
! style="background:white" colspan=8 | 
|-
|-  bgcolor="#CCFFCC"
|  2019-03-31 || Win || align="left" | Andy Souwer || |ONE Championship 93: A New Era || Tokyo, Japan || TKO (ref stoppage) || 2 || 0:51
|-  bgcolor="#CCFFCC"
| 2018-12-07|| Win||align=left| Luis Regis || |ONE Championship: Destiny of Champions || Malaysia || KO (Right Uppercuts) || 1 || 2:08
|-
|-  bgcolor="#CCFFCC"
| 2018-07-28|| Win||align=left|  Yuan Bing   || EM-Legend 32 || China || Decision || 4 || 3:00
|-
|-  bgcolor="#CCFFCC"
| 2018-05-18|| Win||align=left|  Chris Ngimbi   || ONE Championship: Unstoppable Dreams || Singapore || Decision (Unanimous) || 3 || 3:00
|-
|-  bgcolor="#CCFFCC"
| 2018-02-03 || Win ||align=left| Enriko Kehl  || Wu Lin Feng 2018: World Championship in Shenzhen || Shenzhen, China || Decision (Unanimous) || 3 || 3:00
|-
|-  bgcolor="#CCFFCC"
| 2017-05-14 || Win ||align=left| Soichiro Miyakoshi  || Kunlun Fight 61 - Group H Tournament Final || Sanya, China || Decision (Unanimous) || 3 || 3:00
|-
! style=background:white colspan=9 |
|-
|-  bgcolor="#CCFFCC"
| 2017-05-14 || Win ||align=left| Cedric Manhoef || Kunlun Fight 61 - Group H Tournament Semi Finals || Sanya, China || Decision (Unanimous) || 3 || 3:00
|-
|-  bgcolor="#CCFFCC"
| 2017-04-15 || Win ||align=left| Masoud Minaei || MAS 1 || Guangzhou, China || TKO (Referee Stoppage/ 3 Knockdowns) || 1 ||
|-
|-  bgcolor="#CCFFCC"
| 2017-02-26 || Win ||align=left| Khambakhadov Saifullah || Kunlun Fight 57 || Sanya, China || KO (Right uppercut) || 2 || 1:32
|-
|-  bgcolor="#CCFFCC"
| 2015-10-31 || Win ||align=left| Dzhabar Askerov || Kunlun Fight 33 - World Max Tournament 2015 Final 16 || Changde, China || Decision || 3 || 3:00
|-
! style=background:white colspan=9 | 
|- 
|-  style="background:#cfc;"
| 2015-08-08|| Win ||align=left| Marco Tentori || Origins 7: Yodsanklai vs Marco || Perth, Australia || Decision (unanimous) || 5 || 3:00
|-  style="background:#cfc;"
| 2015-07-01|| Win ||align=left| Victor Nagbe || T-One Muay Thai 2015 || Beijing, China || Decision (unanimous) || 3 || 3:00
|-  style="background:#cfc;"
| 2015-06-07|| Win ||align=left| Dzianis Zuev || Kunlun Fight 26 || Chongqing, China || Decision (unanimous) || 3 || 3:00
|-  style="background:#cfc;"
| 2015-05-02|| Win ||align=left| Hamish Willey || THAI FIGHT Proud to Be Thai 2015: Samui || Samui, Thailand  || KO (Left punch) ||1|| 
|-  style="background:#cfc;"
| 2015-04-12|| Win ||align=left| Marat Grigorian || Kunlun Fight 22 || Changde, China || Decision || 3 || 
|-  style="background:#cfc;"
| 2014-12-21 || Win ||align=left| Christophe Pruvost || THAI FIGHT 2014 – 70 kg/154 lb Tournament Final || Bangkok, Thailand || TKO || 1 ||
|-
! style=background:white colspan=9 |
|-  style="background:#cfc;"
| 2014-11-22 || Win ||align=left| Alex Oller || THAI FIGHT 2014 – 70 kg/154 lb Tournament Semi-finals || Khon Kaen, Thailand || KO (Elbows) || 1 ||
|-  style="background:#cfc;"
| 2014-10-25|| Win || align=left| Mohammed El-Mir || THAI FIGHT 2014 – 70 kg/154 lb Tournament Quarter-finals || Bangkok, Thailand || TKO || 1 || 
|-  style="background:#cfc;"
| 2014-09-05 || Win ||align=left| Salah Khalifa || Lion Fight 18 || Las Vegas, Nevada, USA || KO (punches and knee ) || 2 || 2:38
|-
! style=background:white colspan=9 |
|-  style="background:#cfc;"
| 2014-06-28 || Win ||align=left| Fady Abboud || THAI FIGHT WORLD BATTLE 2014: Macao || Macau, China || KO (Left High Kick) || 2 || 
|-
|-  style="background:#cfc;"
| 2014-04-06 ||Win ||align=left| Diogo Calado || THAI FIGHT WORLD BATTLE 2014: Chakrinaruebet || Sattahip, Thailand || Decision || 3 || 3:00
|-
|-  style="background:#cfc;"
| 2014-02-22 ||Win ||align=left| Keo Rumchong || THAI FIGHT WORLD BATTLE 2014: Klai Kang Won || Hua Hin, Thailand || KO (punches) ||2 ||  
|- 
|-  style="background:#cfc;"
| 2013-12-22 ||Win ||align=left| Expedito Valin || THAI FIGHT 2013 – 70 kg/154 lb Tournament Final || Bangkok, Thailand || KO (punches) ||2 || 
|-
! style=background:white colspan=9 |
|-  style="background:#cfc;"
| 2013-11-30 ||Win ||align=left| Samy Sana || THAI FIGHT 2013 – 70 kg/154 lb Tournament Semi-finals || Bangkok, Thailand ||Decision ||3 || 3:00
|-  style="background:#cfc;"
| 2013-10-23 || Win ||align=left| Vladimir Konsky || THAI FIGHT 2013 – 70 kg/154 lb Tournament Quarter-finals || Bangkok, Thailand || KO (left elbow) || 1 || 
|-  style="background:#cfc;"
| 2013-07-26 || Win ||align=left| Chike Lindsay || Lion Fight 10 || Las Vegas, Nevada, USA || Decision (unanimous) || 5 || 3:00
|-
! style=background:white colspan=9 |
|-  style="background:#cfc;"
| 2013-06-29 || Win ||align=left| Kazbek Zubarov || THAI FIGHT EXTREME 2013: Bangkok || Bangkok, Thailand || TKO (injury) || 1 || 3:00
|-  style="background:#cfc;"
| 2013-04-19 || Win ||align=left| Naimjon Tuhtaboyev || THAI FIGHT EXTREME 2013: Pattaya || Pattaya, Thailand || TKO (right hook) || 2 ||
|-  style="background:#cfc;"
| 2013-03-02 || Win ||align=left| Yohan Lidon || Warriors Night || Levallois, France || Decision (unanimous) || 5 || 3:00
|-  style="background:#cfc;"
| 2013-01-25 || Win ||align=left| Gregory Choplin || Lion Fight 8 || Las Vegas, Nevada, USA || KO (punches) || 3 || 2:40
|-  style="background:#cfc;"
| 2012-12-30 || Win ||align=left| Kem Sitsongpeenong || Muay Thai Combat Mania: Pattaya || Pattaya, Thailand || KO (elbow) || 3 || 
|-  style="background:#cfc;"
| 2012-05-26 || Win ||align=left| Vladimír Moravčík || Profiliga Muaythai 12 || Banska Bystrica, Slovakia || TKO || 3 || 
|-
! style=background:white colspan=9 |
|-  style="background:#fbb;"
| 2011-11-26 || Loss ||align=left| Artur Kyshenko ||Rumble of the Kings 2011 || Stockholm, Sweden || Decision (Unanimous)|| 3 || 3:00
|-  style="background:#fbb;"
| 2011-10-28 || Loss ||align=left| Prakaysaeng Sit Or || Toyota Vigo Marathon 2011, Final || Korat, Thailand || Decision || 3 || 2:00
|-
! style=background:white colspan=9 |
|-  style="background:#cfc;"
| 2011-10-28 || Win ||align=left| Antuan Siangboxing || Toyota Vigo Marathon 2011, Semi Final || Korat, Thailand || Decision || 3 || 2:00
|-  style="background:#cfc;"
| 2011-10-28 || Win ||align=left| Sirimongkon Sitanupap || Toyota Vigo Marathon 2011, Quarter Final || Korat, Thailand || Decision || 3 || 2:00 
|-  style="background:#cfc;"
| 2011-11-05 || Win ||align=left| Hou Xu || Legends of Heroes 2011 || Changsha,  China  || TKO || 1 ||  
|-  style="background:#c5d2ea;"
| 2011-08-13 || Draw ||align=left| Aotegen Bateer || Legends of Heroes: Kung Fu vs Muaythai || Nanchang,  China  || Ext. R Decision || 4 || 3:00
|-  style="background:#fbb;"
| 2011-08-07 || Loss ||align=left| Yasuhito Shirasu || THAI FIGHT EXTREME 2011: Japan || Ariake Coliseum, Japan || Decision (Unanimous) || 3 || 3:00
|-  style="background:#cfc;"
| 2011-07-17 || Win ||align=left| Karim Ghajji || THAI FIGHT EXTREME 2011: Hong Kong || Hong Kong, China || Decision || 3 || 3:00
|-  style="background:#cfc;"
| 2011-06-18 || Win ||align=left| Fran Palenzuela || Fighting Legend - World Professional Championships || Chengdu, China || TKO || 2 || 
|-  style="background:#cfc;"
| 2011-05-14 || Win ||align=left| Jose Barradas || THAI FIGHT EXTREME 2011: France || Cannes, France || Decision || 3 || 3:00
|-  style="background:#cfc;"
| 2010-12-05|| Win  ||align=left| Cosmo Alexandre || Kings Birthday 2010, Final || Bangkok, Thailand || Decision || 3 || 2:00
|-
! style=background:white colspan=9 |
|-  style="background:#cfc;"
| 2010-12-05|| Win  ||align=left| Jordan Watson || Kings Birthday 2010, Semi final || Bangkok, Thailand || Decision || 3 || 2:00
|-  style="background:#cfc;"
| 2010-12-05|| Win  ||align=left| Vuyisile Colossa || Kings Birthday 2010, Quarter final || Bangkok, Thailand || Decision || 3 || 2:00
|-  style="background:#fbb;"
| 2010-10-17 || Loss ||align=left| John Wayne Parr || Pay Back Time 2, Powerplay Promotions || Melbourne, Australia || Decision (Split) || 5 || 3:00
|-
! style=background:white colspan=9 |
|-  style="background:#cfc;"
| 2010-10-09 || Win ||align=left| Wang Guan || Legends of Heroes: Muaythai vs Kung Fu || Pahang, Malaysia || Decision || 3 || 3:00  
|-  style="background:#cfc;"
| 2010-03-20 || Win ||align=left| Abdel Halim Issaoui || Kickboxing Superstar XIX Edition || Milan, Italy ||TKO (Cut) || 4 || 
|-  style="background:#fbb;"
| 2010-02-13 || Loss ||align=left| Vuyisile Colossa || Boxe-Thai Guinea tournament 2 || Malabo, Equatorial Guinea || Decision (Unanimous) || 5 || 3:00
|-  style="background:#cfc;"
| 2009-11-29 || Win ||align=left| Khalid Bourdif || SLAMM "Nederland vs Thailand VI" || Almere, Netherlands || Decision (Unanimous) || 5 || 3:00
|-
! style=background:white colspan=9 |
|-  style="background:#cfc;"
| 2009-11-07 || Win ||align=left| Marco Pique || Janus FightNight: Thai Boxe Last Challenge || Padua, Italy || Decision (Unanimous) || 3 || 3:00
|-  style="background:#cfc;"
| 2009-06-26 || Win ||align=left| Cosmo Alexandre || Champions of Champions 2 || Montego Bay, Jamaica || KO (Left low kick) || 4 || 0:25
|-
! style=background:white colspan=9 |
|-  style="background:#cfc;"
| 2009-03-26 || Win ||align=left| Vuyisile Colossa || Les Stars du Ring 2009 || Levallois-Perret, France || Decision (Unanimous) || 5 || 3:00
|-  style="background:#cfc;"
| 2009-01-18 || Win ||align=left| Takaaki Nakamura || M.I.D. Japan presents "Thailand Japan" 2009 || Japan || Decision (Unanimous) || 5 || 3:00
|-
! style=background:white colspan=9 |
|-  style="background:#cfc;"
| 2008-12-20 || Win ||align=left| Lamsongkram Chuwattana || Boxe-Thai Guinea tournament || Malabo, Equatorial Guinea || KO (Right uppercut) || 1 || 2:50
|-
! style=background:white colspan=9 |
|-  style="background:#cfc;"
| 2008-12-20 || Win ||align=left| Yohan Lidon || Boxe-Thai Guinea tournament || Malabo, Equatorial Guinea || TKO (Doctor stop/eye injury) || 2 || 3:00
|-  style="background:#cfc;"
| 2008-12-20 || Win ||align=left| Denis Varaksa || Boxe-Thai Guinea tournament || Malabo, Equatorial Guinea || KO (Punches) || 3 || 1:08
|-  style="background:#cfc;"
| 2008-11-25 || Win ||align=left| Vuyisile Colossa || Planet Battle || Hong Kong, China || Decision (Unanimous) || 3 || 3:00
|-  style="background:#cfc;"
| 2008-09-17 || Win ||align=left| Madsua lamai gym  || Return Of The Contenders || Singapore City || KO (Body shot) || 3 || 2:42
|-
! style=background:white colspan=9 |
|-  style="background:#cfc;"
| 2008-06-20 || Win ||align=left| Malaipet Team Diamond || Champions of Champions || Montego Bay, Jamaica || TKO (Doc stop/cut, swollen left eye) || 3 || 3:00
|-
! style=background:white colspan=9 |
|-  style="background:#cfc;"
| 2008-05-31 || Win ||align=left| Artem Levin || K-1 Scandinavia MAX 2008 || Stockholm, Sweden || KO (Right hook) || 2 || 0:40
|-
! style=background:white colspan=9 |
|-  style="background:#cfc;"
| 2008-04-12 || Win ||align=left| John Wayne Parr || The Contender Asia Finale || Singapore City || Decision (Unanimous) || 5 || 3:00
|-
! style=background:white colspan=9 |
|-  style="background:#fbb;"
| 2008-03-02 || Loss ||align=left| Andy Souwer || SLAMM "Nederland vs Thailand IV" || Almere, Netherlands || Ext. R Decision || 4 || 3:00
|-  style="background:#cfc;"
| 2008-02-09 || Win ||align=left| Dimitry Simoukov || KO World Series 2008 Auckland || Auckland, New Zealand || KO (Left hook) || 1 || 2:23
|-
! style=background:white colspan=9 |
|-  style="background:#cfc;"
| 2008-02-09 || Win ||align=left| Shannon Foreman || KO World Series 2008 Auckland || Auckland, New Zealand || TKO (Corner stoppage) || 2 || 2:10
|-  style="background:#cfc;"
| 2007-11-29 || Win ||align=left| Farid Villaume || France vs Thailand || Paris, France || TKO (Referee stoppage) || 3 ||
|-  style="background:#cfc;"
| 2007-10-00 || Win ||align=left| Sean Wright || The Contender Asia Season I, Episode 13 || Singapore || KO (Right uppercut) || 2 || 1:18
|-  style="background:#cfc;"
| 2007-09-00 || Win ||align=left| Naruepol Fairtex || The Contender Asia Season I, Episode 9 || Singapore || KO (Punches) || 2 || 0:30
|-  style="background:#cfc;"
| 2007-09-00 || Win ||align=left| Bruce Macfie || The Contender Asia Season I, Episode 4 || Singapore || Decision (Unanimous) || 5 || 3:00
|-  style="background:#cfc;"
| 2007-05-30 || Win ||align=left| Sebastien Favre || Fairtex Thepprasit Stadium || Pattaya, Thailand || TKO (Referee stoppage) || 2 || 2:44
|-  style="background:#c5d2ea;"
| 2007-05-30 || Draw ||align=left| Farid Villaume || France vs Thailand || Paris, France || Draw || 5 || 3:00
|-  style="background:#cfc;"
| 2007-01-11 || Win ||align=left| Rafik Bakkouri || Fairtex Thepprasit Stadium || Pattaya, Thailand || KO (Knee strike) || 3 || 1:30
|-  style="background:#cfc;"
| 2006-11-11 || Win ||align=left| Mark Vogel || Masters Fight Night || Wuppertal, Germany || KO (Elbow) || 1 || 
|-
! style=background:white colspan=9 |
|-  style="background:#cfc;"
| 2006-08-23 || Win ||align=left| Rasmus Zoeylner || WPMF Championships || Nakhon Sawan, Thailand || Decision (Unanimous) || 5 || 3:00
|-
! style=background:white colspan=9 |
|-  style="background:#cfc;"
| 2006-06-30 || Win ||align=left| Kamal El Amrani || K-1 World MAX 2006 World Championship Final || Yokohama, Japan || Decision (Unanimous) || 3 || 3:00
|-  style="background:#cfc;"
| 2006-05-13 || Win ||align=left| Maciej Skupinski || Best of The Best II || Warsaw, Poland || TKO || 1 || 
|-  style="background:#cfc;"
| 2006-04-12 || Win ||align=left| Arslan Iran Rompo Gym || Fairtex Thepprasit Stadium || Pattaya, Thailand || TKO (Referee stoppage) || 1 ||
|-  style="background:#cfc;"
| 2006-02-11 || Win ||align=left| Elias Ayras || Lumpinee Krikkri, Lumpinee Stadium || Bangkok, Thailand || TKO (Referee stoppage) || 2 ||
|-  style="background:#cfc;"
| 2005-12-10 || Win ||align=left| John Wayne Parr || Xplosion 12 || Gold Coast, Australia || Decision (Unanimous) || 5 || 3:00
|-
! style=background:white colspan=9 |
|-  style="background:#cfc;"
| 2005-09-06 || Win ||align=left| Samkor Kiatmontep || Petchyindee, Lumpinee Stadium || Bangkok, Thailand || Decision (Unanimous) || 5 || 3:00
|-
! style=background:white colspan=9 |
|-  style="background:#cfc;"
| 2005-08-16 || Win ||align=left| Riuankaew S.Boonya || Fairtex, Lumpinee Stadium || Bangkok, Thailand || TKO || 2 || 
|-
! style=background:white colspan=9 |
|-  style="background:#fbb;"
| 2005-07-08 || Loss ||align=left| Noppadeat Siangsimaew gym || Kiatphet, Lumpinee Stadium || Bangkok, Thailand || Decision (Unanimous) || 5 || 3:00
|-  style="background:#cfc;"
| 2005-03-24 || Win ||align=left| Noppakao Sor Wanchart || Daorungchujarean, Rajadamnern Stadium || Bangkok, Thailand || Decision (Unanimous) || 5 || 3:00
|-  style="background:#cfc;"
| 2005-02-25 || Win ||align=left| Tuantong Chartchatree || Petchyindee, Lumpinee Stadium || Bangkok, Thailand || TKO || 3 || 
|-  style="background:#fbb;"
| 2005-01-21 || Loss ||align=left| Orono Wor Petchpun || Wanboonya, Lumpinee Stadium || Bangkok, Thailand || KO (Knee strikes) || 3 || 
|-  style="background:#cfc;"
| 2004-12-23 || Win ||align=left| Lakhin Sor.Saraythong || Daorungchujaroen, Rajadamnern Stadium || Bangkok, Thailand || Decision || 5 || 3:00
|-  style="background:#cfc;"
| 2004-11-12 || Win ||align=left| Sakadpetch Ingram gym || Fairtex, Lumpinee Stadium || Bangkok, Thailand || Decision || 5 || 3:00
|-  style="background:#fbb;"
| 2004-08-27 || Loss ||align=left| Sakadpetch Ingram gym || Wanboonya, Lumpinee Stadium || Bangkok, Thailand || Decision (Unanimous) || 5 || 3:00
|-  style="background:#cfc;"
| 2004-07-14 || Win ||align=left| Lakhin Sakjavee || Daorungprabat, Rajadamnern Stadium || Bangkok, Thailand || Decision || 5 || 3:00
|-  style="background:#cfc;"
| 2004-06-22 || Win ||align=left| Charlie Sor Chaitamin || Fairtex, Lumpinee Stadium || Bangkok, Thailand || TKO (Left Straight) || 1 ||
|-  style="background:#fbb;"
| 2004-05-04 || Loss ||align=left| Orono Wor Petchpun || Petchyindee, Lumpinee Stadium || Bangkok, Thailand || TKO (Elbows and Punches) || 4 || 
|-  style="background:#fbb;"
| 2004-04-02 || Loss ||align=left| Singdam Kiatmoo9 || Petchyindee + Wanwerapon, Lumpinee Stadium || Bangkok, Thailand || Decision (Unanimous) || 5 || 3:00
|-  style="background:#cfc;"
| 2004-01-27 || Win ||align=left| Watcharachai Kaewsamrit || Petchpiya, Lumpinee Stadium || Bangkok, Thailand || TKO || 1 ||
|-  style="background:#cfc;"
| 2004-01-03 || Win ||align=left| Pornpitak Petchudomchai || Lumpinee krikkai, Lumpinee Stadium || Bangkok, Thailand || KO || 2 ||
|-  style="background:#cfc;"
| 2003-11-15 || Win ||align=left| Nopparat Keatkhamtorn || Lumpinee krikkai, Lumpinee Stadium || Bangkok, Thailand || Decision || 5 || 3:00
|-  style="background:#cfc;"
| 2003-10-11 || Win ||align=left| Phutawan Buriramphukaofire || Lumpinee krikkai, Lumpinee Stadium || Bangkok, Thailand || KO (Left cross) || 3 || 2:47
|-  style="background:#cfc;"
| 2003-08-16 || Win ||align=left| Kaew Fairtex || Lumpinee krikkai, Lumpinee Stadium || Bangkok, Thailand || Decision || 5 || 3:00
|-  style="background:#fbb;"
| 2003-06-14 || Loss ||align=left| Wanmeechai Menayotin || Lumpinee krikkai, Lumpinee Stadium || Bangkok, Thailand || Decision || 5 || 3:00
|-  style="background:#cfc;"
| 2003-03-28 || Win ||align=left| Nopparat Keatkhamtorn || Lumpinee Stadium - Toyota Marathon, Final || Bangkok, Thailand || KO (Uppercut) || 3 || 
|-
! style=background:white colspan=9 |

|-  style="background:#fbb;"
| 2003-02-18 || Loss ||align=left| Pornsanae Sitmonchai || Fairtex, Lumpinee Stadium || Bangkok, Thailand || TKO || 4 ||
|-  style="background:#fbb;"
| 2003-01-14 || Loss ||align=left| Pornsanae Sitmonchai || Petpanomurung, Lumpinee Stadium || Bangkok, Thailand || KO || 3 || :
|-  style="background:#cfc;"
| 2002 || Win ||align=left| Sam-A Kaiyanghadaogym || Lumpinee Stadium || Bangkok, Thailand || Decision || 5 || 3:00
|-  style="background:#fbb;"
| 2002-07-05 || Loss||align=left| Wanpichai Sor.Khamsing || Lumpinee Stadium || Bangkok, Thailand || Decision || 5 || 3:00
|-  style="background:#fbb;"
| 2002-04-09 || Loss ||align=left| Pethapee Chor Chingwong || Muaythai Gala || Thailand || KO || 3 ||
|-  style="background:#cfc;"
| 2002-01-04 || Win ||align=left| Yortong Pitak-Kruchaiden || Lumpinee Stadium || Bangkok, Thailand || KO || 3 ||
|-  style="background:#cfc;"
| 2001-08-21 || Win ||align=left| Dejdamrong Sor Amnuaysirichoke || Lumpinee Stadium || Bangkok, Thailand || Decision || 5 || 3:00
|-  style="background:#cfc;"
| 2001-04-13 || Win ||align=left| Namsuek Petchsupaphan || Lumpinee Stadium || Bangkok, Thailand || Decision || 5 || 3:00
|-
| colspan=9 | Legend:

Amateur record

|-  style="background:#fbb;"
| 2010-09-02 || Loss ||align=left| Artem Levin || 2010 World Combat Games -75 kg Muay Thai, Final || Beijing, China || Decision (2-3) || 4 || 2:00
|-
! style=background:white colspan=9 |
|-  style="background:#cfc;"
| 2010-08-31 || Win ||align=left| Vasyl Tereshonok || 2010 World Combat Games -75 kg Muay Thai, Semi finals || Beijing, China || Decision (4-1) || 4 || 2:00
|-  style="background:#cfc;"
| 2010-08-29 || Win ||align=left| Guilherme Jung || 2010 World Combat Games -75 kg Muay Thai, Quarter finals || Beijing, China || TKO (Referee Stoppage) || ||
|-
| colspan=9 | Legend:

See also
 List of male kickboxers
 Champions of Champions Elite

References

1985 births
Living people
Flyweight kickboxers
Bantamweight kickboxers
Featherweight kickboxers
Lightweight kickboxers
Welterweight kickboxers
Middleweight kickboxers
Yodsanklai Fairtex
Yodsanklai Fairtex
The Contender (TV series) participants
Kunlun Fight kickboxers
ONE Championship kickboxers